Guangzhou–Shenzhen–Hong Kong Express Rail Link (XRL), also known as “Guangshengang XRL” (officially Beijing–Guangzhou–Shenzhen–Hong Kong high-speed railway, Guangzhou–Shenzhen–Hong Kong section), is a high-speed railway line that connects Beijing and Hong Kong (Kowloon) via Guangzhou and Shenzhen.

Three types of rolling stock that operate along the XRL: Hexie (Harmony) and Fuxing (Rejuvenation) operated by China Railway, and Vibrant Express by MTR Corporation.

The first phase, Shenzhen North–Guangzhou South, commenced revenue operation in December 2011. Services were extended to the city centre of Shenzhen at Futian in December 2015. The final phase, which connects Shenzhen-Futian to Hong Kong (West Kowloon) was inaugurated on 22 September 2018. It opened for public on Sunday 23 September 2018.

Journey times

 Hong Kong (West Kowloon) – Futian: 14 minutes
 Hong Kong (West Kowloon) – Shenzhen North: 19 minutes (fastest)
 Hong Kong (West Kowloon) – Guangzhou South: 47 minutes (fastest)

History

Background
The railway connecting the mainland China has been important for Hong Kong since the 20th century. After the establishment of the People's Republic of China, three railway lines from the mainland, also known as “santang kuaiche” (three cargo express trains), were arranged to transport fresh food every day to maintain the daily needs of the Hong Kong people. A high-speed railway connecting Guangzhou, Shenzhen and Hong Kong, railway was brought up in the late 1990s by the Government of Hong Kong. This Regional Express Railway (RER) proposal was developed in the 1994 “Railway Development Study” (RDS); it foresaw a continual growth of Hong Kong's population over the next two decades and strong demand for cross-border passenger traffic. The Hong Kong (SAR) Government commissioned a second Railway Development Study in March 1998. The Study went further on the British proposal of connecting Hong Kong and China from Kowloon. The RER could be further extended to Hong Kong Island. At the same time, the report recommended that Hung Hom station should continue to play a central role in Hong Kong's mass transit. Since the typical timeframe for rail projects, from conception to completion phase, would take eight or nine years, the Railway Development Study recommended that the Hong Kong (SAR) Government should commence as soon as possible, so that the new express railway could be constructed in time to meet capacity demands.

Maglev proposal
In September 1999, the then mayor of Guangzhou, Lin Shusen, announced his “Suigang maglev rail project” at the "Fortune Global Forum" in Shanghai. Lin was already working with then-Chief Executive of Hong Kong, Tung Chee-hwa, on the development of Hong Kong Disneyland. Lin proposed that a maglev railway between Guangzhou and Hong Kong would benefit visitor numbers. The cost of construction was to be borne in equal proportion by governments of both cities.

Railway Development Strategy 2000
The Hong Kong government, based on the results of the Second Railway Development Study by the Department of Transportation, issued a new plan, “Railway Development Strategy 2000 – new railway strategy”. On 16 May's Legislative Council meeting, the Legco Panel on Transport Railway Development Strategy tabled the strategy for use by the Hong Kong (SAR) Government. The Executive Council (upper house) recommended that, under the Chief Executive's advice, Hong Kong should adopt the "Railway Development Strategy 2000" until a further review in 2016.

Regional Express Railway
“Railway Development Strategy 2000” recommended new six new rail corridors, through the New Territories, connecting the East Rail or the West Rail line to the border, operating between Hung Hom and the border in an express manner similar to Hong Kong Airport's Airport Express line. " The decision to build a “Regional Express”, depended on the Lok Ma Chau Spur provided additional transport capacity which would soon be saturated. According to the 1998 price estimates, construction of the RER needed a budget of about HK$130 to 170 billion. It was intended that this railway would be operated by the Kowloon-Canton Railway Corporation or the Mass Transit Railway Corporation, depending on the location of the downtown terminal.

At that time about the “Regional Express” concept, was not a high-speed rail, but only a commuter line connecting the city and the border with “rapid rail” services, in addition to the idea of a small number of intermediate stations being set up alongside the route, but also allowing for Hong Kong and China Intercity trains to run, reducing the load on the existing East Rail line. At that time the initial alignment program has two starting points located around Hung Hom station. The first one was the Eastern scheme, a new line following the East Rail line of pink Lingnan station, connecting to Lo Wu station or a new rail crossings in the east of Luohu. However, this proposal needed to co-operation with the mainland. The second program for a new line from the West Rail line at Kam Sheung Road station, northwards to Lo Wu or Lok Ma Chau station.

Since 2001, the Hong Kong government began working on the “Regional Express” with mainland China, and discussing the feasibility of cooperation on “Suigang maglev rail project”. In 2001, the Hong Kong DoT, with the Shenzhen Municipal Government and Chinese railway authorities to explore the use of “RER” and maglev technology, project feasibility and actively using magnetic levitation technology to build a line from Hong Kong to Canton/Guangzhou. The study pointed out that the use of a maglev train would reduce the Hong Kong to Shenzhen running time of 40 minutes to 15 minutes. September 2001, when he was the Hong Kong SAR Chief Secretary Donald Tsang, visited Canton/Guangzhou, where he met with the Governor of Guangdong Province, Lu Ruihua, acting mayor of Guangzhou, Lin Shusen and Shenzhen Mayor Yu Youjun for talks about the “Regional Express line concept”. Tung attended the Shanghai APEC Summit in October 2001, formally proposing the construction of a maglev railway between Canton/Guangzhou and Hong Kong Express Line plans to the State Planning Commission. The Mayor of Shenzhen Yu Youjun said at a news conference at the APEC Senior Officials' Meeting, Shenzhen and Hong Kong is planning to build maglev railway and to continue to discuss the issue. But also at this time, the Guangzhou-Shenzhen Railway Co. also made a Guangzhou–Kowloon Through Train speed plan.

Switch to high-speed rail
By the end of January 2002, the concept of “Regional Express” gained further development. Tsang in Beijing to attend the “Mainland and Hong Kong SAR major infrastructure coordination meeting”, and with the State Development Planning Commission and the relevant ministry officials, the talks were initially on Regional Express railway line connecting Guangzhou, Shenzhen and Hong Kong, focussing on the design and coordination of consensus between the parties. The central government officially approved research and co-ordination by the Ministry of Railways, and officially named this railway the "Guangzhou–Shenzhen–Hong Kong Express Rail Link". With a formal agreement with the Hong Kong SAR Government, decided by the Ministry of Railways, led the establishment of an expert group to study the construction of the Regional Express high-speed rail line.

In February 2002, in the framework of “collaborative meetings” by the Hong Kong SAR Government Environment, Transport and Works Bureau and the Ministry of Railways, the Guangzhou–Shenzhen–Hong Kong Express Rail Link Planning Group was established, which meant the “Railway Development Strategy 2000” planned “Regional Express” was set aside for the “Guangzhou–Shenzhen–Hong Kong Express Rail Link - Hong Kong section”. The planning Group conducted preliminary studies on the main railway necessity, function, alignment, location transit, rail technology and economic benefits.

The first phase of the study topics included the functional and strategic importance of the Guangzhou–Shenzhen–Hong Kong Express Rail Link project, the relevant regional passenger transport demand analysis and forecasting, as well as railway lines and public transit locations. The first phase of the study completed in September 2002 and reported on the September 20th 2002 at the Second “Mainland and Hong Kong's major infrastructure cooperation held meeting”. At the meeting, the high-speed rail planning team reported the first phase of on the planning for the GZ-SZ-HK XRL. Including the necessities of GZ-SZ-HK XRL construction, function and regional transportation needs, forecasting and route traffic in order to determine the strategic value of the railway. Experts in Hong Kong and mainland China reached a consensus after comparing different alignments, shortlisting two options, “Guangzhou East – Dongguan – Lin Tong – Hong Kong” and “Panyu – Nansha – Shekou – Hong Kong”. A planning goal was to reduce Guangzhou to Hong Kong travel time from 100 minutes to less than 60 minutes. In addition, effective integration with the national high-speed rail network and the connections with the planned Pearl River Delta intercity rapid rail transit network.

The second phase of the study, included rail alignments, station locations and the Hong Kong section of the Guangzhou–Shenzhen line connections, the main technical standards, passenger flow forecasting, financial benefits. During the study, in response to the latest developments of both the overall urban planning and transportation network planning, the Ministries of Railways, Environment, Transport and Works respectively needed to consider some new ideas and make adjustments for the Hong Kong section of GZ–SZ–HK XRL project. In mainland China, the Ministry of Railways had to consider the feasibility of the PRD Intercity Rapid Rail network together with the Guangzhou–Shenzhen section of GZ–SZ–HK XRL. In Hong Kong, the government began to consider the use of the proposed North West Rail Link, Northern Link and the feasibility GZ–SZ–HK XRL Hong Kong section. Kowloon-Canton Railway Corporation and the Hong Kong Mass Transit Railway Corporation produced a consolidated joint report submitted to the Government, it was a preliminary assessment of their ideas, but also required further studies by the Environment, Transport and Works Bureau & KCRC of the Northern Link.

In the first and second phases of the study, the planning team had to investigate and compare the traditional wheel-rail and maglev technologies. Operating and maintenance costs were greater with maglev than with wheel-rail technology, The construction period of the project was expected to be longer for maglev than the wheel-rail technology solutions. Maglev was not conducive to the existing rail network and compatibility. Thus to reach the GZ–SZ–HK XRL's three goals, there was no need to adopt a relatively high cost and the technical difficulty of maglev technology. Thus, despite the advantages that high-speed maglev technology has, until August 2003, both sides tended to choose more mature high-speed wheel-rail plans. In other words, the "Regional Express" that was originally intended to have been conceived as a maglev train was cancelled.

In March 2003, the Guangzhou Railway Group Corporation general manager, Wú Jùnguāng, at the National People's Congress, submitted a bill that called for the construction of a Guangzhou–Shenzhen–Hong Kong Express Rail Link Passenger Line as soon as possible. The Guangzhou–Shenzhen Railway utilization has exceeded 90% and was saturated. According to the existing passenger growth rate, to 2005, the Guangzhou East to Shenzhen route would require 96-151 train pairs daily, which will greatly exceed the capacity of the line. It is difficult to meet the transportation needs of the future with the new high-speed rail showing greater potential in the pipeline.

On 7 January 2004, China's State Council considered the “long-term railway network plan”, deciding to build more than 12,000 kilometers of “four vertical and four horizontal” Passenger Lines, including Hong Kong in the planning. The Guangzhou–Shenzhen section of the Guangzhou–Shenzhen–Hong Kong Express Rail Link correspondingly accelerated planning until July 2004, decinding to adopt the “Panyu – Nansha – Shekou – Hong Kong” route. The station located in Guangzhou's Panyu district would also connect with the Wuhan–Guangzhou Passenger Line.

Route 

The  route starts with a connection to the Wuguang High-Speed Railway at Guangzhou South railway station in Shibi, southern Guangzhou (Canton). From there it travels south to the same district before tunnelling eastwards underneath the Pearl River to Humen in Dongguan. It then moves south through three stations within Shenzhen and then across into Hong Kong where it arrives at West Kowloon Terminus in Kowloon.

This project has been divided into two sections, the Guangshen section with six stations, and the Hong Kong section, with one station.

Mainland Section

From there it travels south to Qingsheng before tunnelling eastwards underneath the Pearl River to Humen in Dongguan. It then moves south to Guangmingcheng, Shenzhen North and Futian(u/c) in Shenzhen.

Originally the station in Humen was to be named Dongguan but this was changed to Humen to avoid confusion with an existing Dongguan railway station on the Guangzhou–Shenzhen Railway in the town of Changping.

Hong Kong Section

The Hong Kong section is in total  of dedicated underground track, emergency rescue sidings and the stabling sidings in Shek Kong, ventilation facilities at Mai Po, Ngau Tam Mei and Pat Heung, along with an emergency access point at Tai Kong Po.

The Regional Express Line originally envisaged in the Railway Development Strategy 2000 proposed by the Hong Kong Special Administrative Region Government (HKSAR Government), has now become the Hong Kong section of the Guangzhou–Shenzhen–Hong Kong Express Rail Link (XRL). In April 2008, the HKSAR Government asked the MTR Corporation to carry out further planning and design of the Express Rail Link. Subsequently, the HKSAR Government gazetted the Scheme for the Express Rail Link under the Railways Ordinance to collect public views.

In early 2009, the government of Hong Kong signed a memorandum of understanding with the Chinese Ministry of Railways that would permit the construction of the Shenzhen–Hong Kong section of the railway.

On 20 October 2009, the Chief Executive in Council authorised the scheme and the Amendments of the Scheme of the Express Rail Link. On 16 January 2010, the Finance Committee of the Legislative Council approved the funding application for the construction of the Express Rail Link. The construction commenced in late January 2010 and was completed in September 2018. In October 2014, an MTR report warned that the revised budget of HK$71.5 billion might be at risk. This section had been expected to open in 2015, but severe storms flooded the tunnels and caused immense damage to the Tunnel Boring Machines in March 2014. The railway has been expected to be completed in third quarter of 2018. According to the Rail Merger Bill, MTR Corporation will lease the rights to conduct operations on this line, until 1 December 2057.

With the completion of the section, the journey time through the Rail Link have been reduced to 14 minutes between WKT and Futian stations, 23 minutes between Hong Kong and Shenzhen North and 48 minutes between Hong Kong and Guangzhou South. As of 2015, the cost of the project has risen substantially to HK$85.3 billion.

Construction

 This commenced on 30 December 2004, in line with the overall commencement of the Wuhan-Guangzhou passenger line, building the new Guangzhou South station.
 In September 2005, the National Development and Reform Commission officially approved the “Shenzhen-Hong Kong railway passenger line from Guangzhou to Shenzhen section Feasibility Study”.
 On 18 December 2005, Guangzhou–Shenzhen–Hong Kong Express Rail Link's Guangzhou–Shenzhen section began formal construction.
 In January 2010, construction commenced on the Hong Kong section.
 In March 2011, Completion of the 10.8-km-long Shiziyang Tunnel to allow the railway to cross the Shiziyang Channel of the Pearl River between the Dongchong and Humen Stations.
 On 26 December 2011, the Guangzhou–Shenzhen–Hong Kong Express Rail Guangzhou–Shenzhen section opened to Shenzhen North.
 On 30 March 2014, Severe storm hits Hong Kong, flooding the tunnels and damaged the Tunnel Boring Machines. This has caused a 3-month delay to construction.
 On 31 December 2014, The tunnel linking Shenzhen North station and Futian station was reported completed. The construction of the tunnel, which runs about 10 kilometers, took about six years.
 On 30 December 2015, Futian station commences intercity train operations.

Operations

At present, Guangzhou–Shenzhen–Hong Kong Express Rail operates around 104 northbound trains and 101 southbound trains a day, three pairs of separate lines on weekends, a separate peak line 20 pairs and 7 high-speed sleeper train pairs, including:

 Guangzhou South ↔ Chaoshan - 8 pairs, a separate peak line 2 pairs
 Guangzhou South ↔ Shanghai Hongqiao - 3 high-speed sleeper train pairs
 Guangzhou South → Shenzhen North - 17 trains, 3 weekend trains and a separate peak line 2 trains; Shenzhen North→Guangzhou South - 20 trains, 3 weekend trains and a separate peak line 2 trains
 Guangzhou South ↔ Futian - 23 pairs, a separate peak line 4 pairs
 Shenzhen North ↔ Guilin North - 3 pairs
 Shenzhen North ↔ Guiyang North - 1 pair
 Shenzhen North ↔ Nanning East - 3 pairs
 Shenzhen North ↔ Yongzhou - 1 pair
 Shenzhen North ↔ Changsha South - 12 pairs
 Shenzhen North ↔ Shaoyang - 2 pairs
 Shenzhen North ↔ Huaihua South - 4 pairs
 Shenzhen North ↔ Nanchang West- 2 pairs
 Shenzhen North ↔ Yueyang East - 1 pair
 Wuhan ↔ Shenzhen North - 12 pairs
 Yichang ↔ Shenzhen North - 1 pair
 Shenzhen North ↔ Chongqing North - 1 pair
 Shenzhen North ↔ Jinan West - 1 pair
 Shenzhen North ↔ Luohe West - 1 pair
 Shenzhen North ↔ Zhengzhou East - 2 pairs, 1 extra pair of during peaks
 Shenzhen North ↔ Xi'an North - 3 pairs, a separate peak line one pair
 Shenzhen North ↔ Shijiazhuang - 1 pair
 Shenzhen North ↔ Beijing West - 2 pairs, 4 high-speed sleeper train pairs

In December 2014, overnight high-speed sleeper trains were added to several long-distance destinations, such as Beijing.

Stations

 Guangzhou South – Opened 31 January 2010
 Qingsheng – Opened 26 December 2011
 Humen – Opened 26 December 2011
 Guangmingcheng – Opened 26 December 2011
 Shenzhen North – Opened 26 December 2011
 Futian – Opened 30 December 2015
 Hong Kong West Kowloon – Opened 23 September 2018

Trains and equipment

The following is a list of operators using the line and their respective rolling stock :

In Hong Kong, MTR announced their intention to purchase several high-speed EMUs. The tender (contract number: 840) was for 9 trainsets, each with 8 cars and a maximum operating speed of 350 km/h. Chinese manufacturer CSR Qingdao Sifang emerged as the successful bidder, based on the CRH380A "Harmony" model.

Tickets
Train fare table G numbered trains (Business seat fare / VIP Class fare / First Class fare / Second Class fare; Unit: yuan; tickets for children, disabled veterans half price tickets, student tickets share a quarter discount of the fare for a Second Class ticket.)

Accidents and incidents
 At 6:30 on 18 February 2012, power supply equipment failure, resulting in train delays.
 On 26 September 2018, an inbound CR400BF-A trainset was unable to completely open one of its doors at West Kowloon station, as the platform edge exceeded the track's structure gauge. The train was redirected to platform 6. No casualties or injuries were reported. As a result, MTR stated that they were working with mainland authorities to investigate and address the issue and that all inbound CR400BF-A trains were to only use platform 6 until the problem was eliminated.

See also 
 Hong Kong Express Rail Link
 Anti-Hong Kong Express Rail Link movement
 Guangzhou–Kowloon through train
 East Rail line
 Kowloon–Canton Railway
 China Railway High-speed
 Guangzhou–Shenzhen railway
 Pearl River Delta mega-city project

References

External links 
 MTR-Express Rail Link(Hong Kong)
 XRL Project, MTR official site
 expressrailtruth.com, Opposition site 
 Hong Kong anti-rail protest gathers steam - FT.com
 

 
High-speed railway lines in China
Transport in Guangdong